The 2nd Fußball-Bundesliga (women) 2006–07 was the 3rd season of the 2. Fußball-Bundesliga (women), Germany's second football league. It began on 10 September 2006 and ended on 28 May 2007.

Group North

Final standings 

* Potsdam was awarded a 3-point penalty for using a player without a player's license.

Pld = Matches played; W = Matches won; D = Matches drawn; L = Matches lost; GF = Goals for; GA = Goals against; GD = Goal difference; Pts = Points

Group South

Final standings 

Pld = Matches played; W = Matches won; D = Matches drawn; L = Matches lost; GF = Goals for; GA = Goals against; GD = Goal difference; Pts = Points

Relegation play-offs 

For the first time a five teams were relegated after the season. The 11th and 12th-place finishers of each division were automatically relegated while the 10th-place finishers of each division determined the fifth team to be relegated in a match over two legs.

|}

References 

2006-07
Ger
2
Women2